K. P. Haridas is an Indian surgeon specializing in minimally invasive surgeries, and the founder of Chairman of Lords Hospital, a super-specialty healthcare centre.

in Thiruvananthapuram. He is credited with the first successful liver resection, which he performed at the Government Medical College, Thiruvananthapuram.

He is a recipient of the Lifetime Achievement Award from the British South India Council of Commerce (2014) and the Dr. Balsalam Memorial Award. He was honoured by the Government of India in 2015 with Padma Shri, the fourth-highest civilian Indian award.

See also

 Minimally invasive surgery

References

External links
 
 

Recipients of the Padma Shri in medicine
Medical doctors from Kerala
Indian surgeons
Living people
Malayali people
20th-century Indian medical doctors
Year of birth missing (living people)
20th-century surgeons